Best Instrumentals Vol. 2 is a 1999 compilation by Santana.

Track listing 
"Touchdown Raiders"
"Verão Vermelho"
"Revelations"
"Runnin'"
"Primera Invasion"
"Hannibal"
"Samba de Sausalito"
"Free Angela"
"Oye Como Va"
"Singin Winds, Crying Beasts"
"Jingo"
"Toussaint L'Overture"
"Batuka"
"Jungle Strut"

1999 greatest hits albums
Santana (band) compilation albums